Virginia Ruano Pascual and Paola Suárez were the defending champions, but had to withdraw before the start of the tournament.

Lisa Raymond and Rennae Stubbs won the title by defeating Gala León García and María Sánchez Lorenzo 6–1, 6–3 in the final. It was the 17th title for Raymond and the 23rd title for Stubbs, in their respective doubles careers. It was also the 3rd title for the pair in the season, after their wins in the Australian Open and Rome.

Seeds

Draw

Draw

References
 Official Results Archive (ITF)
 Official Results Archive (WTA)

Doubles